Split Ends is a British sitcom made by Granada Television.  It ran for one series on ITV between 7 June and 12 July 1989. It was written by Len Richmond and directed by Alan J. W. Bell.

Cath (played by Anita Dobson) is a woman in her thirties, who runs a hairdresser's shop. Each episode sees Cath trying to decide if she wants to be with Clint (Harry Ditson) or David (Peter Blake). The series also featured Barbara New and Nimmy March in supporting roles.

Episodes
 Head Over Heels (7 June 1989)
 Parting of the Waves (14 June 1989)
 Crew Cuts (21 June 1989)
 Tangles (28 June 1989)
 The Brush Off (5 July 1989)
 Hair Today (12 July 1989)

References

External links

1989 British television series debuts
1989 British television series endings
1980s British sitcoms
British comedy television shows
ITV sitcoms
English-language television shows
Television series by ITV Studios
Television shows produced by Granada Television